is a Japanese former football player who last played for Kamatamare Sanuki.

Career
Takeda retired at the end of the 2019 season.

Club statistics
Updated to 23 February 2020.

References

External links

Profile at Kamatamare Sanuki

1991 births
Living people
Ritsumeikan University alumni
Association football people from Shiga Prefecture
Japanese footballers
J2 League players
J3 League players
Kamatamare Sanuki players
Association football defenders